Under the Covers, Vol. 1 is the first collaboration between alternative rock artist Matthew Sweet and Bangles singer/guitarist Susanna Hoffs. Released by Shout! Factory in 2006, the album contains 15 cover versions of songs from the 1960s and 1970s. The album was a result of their mutual love for songwriting from the 1960s. Matthew Sweet and Susanna Hoffs decided to record an album together in dedication of that era consisting of only cover versions.

The album was released April 2006, and they appeared July 18 on Late Night with Conan O'Brien to promote the album and tour.

Track listing

Volumes 2 & 3

In July 2009, Shout! Factory released their second album, Under the Covers, Vol. 2, covering songs from the 1970s.  Under the Covers, Vol. 3 followed in 2013, containing songs recorded in the 1980s.

Personnel

Susanna Hoffs – vocals, guitar
Matthew Sweet – vocals, guitars, bass guitar, Dolceola, Handclapping, Harpsichord, Mellotron, Mixing, Organ, Piano, Tambourine, Xylophone; also production and mixing
Ivan Julian – acoustic guitar, guitar
Greg Leisz – guitar, pedal steel guitar, 12 string guitar
Richard Lloyd – guitar
Van Dyke Parks – piano, harpsichord, organ, liner notes
Ric Menck – drums, bongos, shaker, tambourine
Shawn Amos – executive producer
Bob Ludwig – mastering
Henry Diltz – photography
Ed Fotheringham – illustrations
Jeff Palo – artwork, package supervision
Todd Gallopo – package design
Julee Stover – editorial supervision
Emily Johnson – project assistant
John Roberts – project assistant

Chart performance

References

External links
 Official Myspace site
 Bangles News Release

2006 albums
Matthew Sweet albums
Susanna Hoffs albums
Covers albums
Collaborative albums
Shout! Factory albums
Albums produced by Matthew Sweet